The Tinton Formation is a geologic formation in New Jersey. It preserves fossils dating back to the Cretaceous-Paleocene periods, such as ammonites.

See also

 List of fossiliferous stratigraphic units in New Jersey
 Paleontology in New Jersey

References
 

Cretaceous geology of New Jersey